Manuel II may refer to:

Manuel II of Trebizond (c. 1324–1333), Emperor of Trebizond
Manuel II Palaiologos (1350–1425), Byzantine Emperor
Patriarch Manuel II of Constantinople, Patriarch of Constantinople from 1244 to 1255
Manuel II of Portugal (1889–1932), King of Portugal
Manuel II, Patriarch of Lisbon (1888–1977)